Luxembourg-Cents is a residential area in the east of Luxembourg city which is also famous for a football stadium. Cents is a quarter of Luxembourg City, in southern Luxembourg.  It is currently the home stadium of FC RM Hamm Benfica which has a capacity of 2,800.

References
World Stadiums - Luxembourg

Football venues in Luxembourg
Sports venues in Luxembourg City